White Shoes & The Couples Company is the self-titled debut from Indonesian pop/jazz band White Shoes & The Couples Company. It was released in 2005 by Indonesian-based Akasara Records. The album made its re-release in 2007 when American label Minty Fresh signed the band to its label. The majority of the songs are in Indonesian, the band's native tongue.

Track listing
The album contains eleven tracks, and two bonus track. The track that titled Indonesian was noted below with literal English translation for global observer. 

Bonus Tracks

Charts and certifications

All-time charts

Personnel
Credits
 Indra Ameng - Art Direction, Clappers, Photography, Producer
 Aprilia Apsari - Composer, Vocals
 Ario - Vocals (Background)
 Reza Asung - Photography
 Babay - Clappers
 Dimas Bibir - Photography
 Mushowir Bing -	Photography
 Andre Blackham - Engineer
 Yusmario Farabi - Composer, Guitar (Acoustic)
 White Shoes & the Couples Company - Composer
Band Line-Up
 Aprilia Apsari (Miss Sari) – Main vocals
 Ricky Virgana (Mr. Ricky) – Kontra Bass, Cello, Bass, Vocals
 John Navid (Mr. John) – Drums, Vibes
 Aprimela Prawidyanti Virgana (Mrs. Mela) – Piano, Viola, Keyboards, Vocals
 Saleh (Mr. Saleh) – Electric guitar, Vocals
 Yusmario Farabi  (Mr. Rio) – Acoustic guitar, Vocals

References

2005 debut albums
White Shoes & The Couples Company albums
Indonesian-language albums